The United Nations Competitive Recruitment Examination is a competitive examination, part of three step selection process for a permanent position with the United Nations consisting of: a written examination, interview, and two year probationary post.

Written examinations
The written examination consists of the following two parts:
a general paper which tests drafting skills (forty-five minutes); and
a specialized paper (three hours and forty-five minutes) which tests the substantive knowledge of the particular occupation that the candidate is applying for.

In cases where the number of candidates sitting the written examination is high, the essay section of the specialized paper will be eliminatory.

The written examination questions are given in English and French, the two working languages of the Secretariat. Candidates must write their answers for the general paper in English or French. However, they may write their answers for the specialized paper in English, French or any of the other four official languages of the Secretariat, i.e., Arabic, Chinese, Russian or Spanish.

Subjects
Not all the subjects are offered every year, but some are offered more often than others. Here a table of subjects given in recent years, together with the number of persons invited to take the written exam in that subject.

The interview
On the basis of performance in the written examination, the Board of Examiners will invite selected candidates to the interview, which will normally take place from 6 to 12 months after the exam.

The interview will be conducted in English or French, the two working languages of the Secretariat.

A modest percentage of those who take the written exam will be convoked to take the interview. For example, of the 395 people who sat for the 2008
IT exam, 39 were convoked to the interview. Of those, 26 were added to the roster of qualified candidates.

Successful after the examination:
Following the completion of the interviews, the Board of Examiners will recommend the most suitable candidates to the Assistant Secretary-General for Human Resources Management of the United Nations.
These candidates will be placed on a reserve roster of qualified candidates. This roster will be circulated among heads of duty stations for selection, further interview, and placement of candidates. The typical time spent on the roster prior to placement in a job with the UN is from 6 months to 3 years.

The decisions of the Board of Examiners regarding the results will be final and are not subject to appeal. The Board does not release individual results.

Successful candidates may be called upon to serve at the U.N. Headquarters in New York or at other duty stations in Africa, Asia, Europe or Latin America.

External links
 Page on the UN website
 Report of the effectiveness of the UN recruiting examination process

Examinations
United Nations documents
United Nations posts